The 2006 World Weightlifting Championships were held in Santo Domingo, Dominican Republic from 30 September to 7 October. The women's 58 kilograms division was staged on 3 October 2006.

Schedule

Medalists

Records

Results

References
Weightlifting World Championships Seniors Statistics, Page 60 
Results 

2006 World Weightlifting Championships
World